Jesús Seade Kuri (Mexico City, 24 December 1946) is an economist, diplomat and politician with a long history of trade negotiations and management of international financial crises. He is, since December 1, 2018, Undersecretary for North America in Mexico’s Ministry of Foreign Affairs (SRE). On June 8, 2020, Dr. Seade was officially nominated by the Mexican government for General Director of the World Trade Organization (WTO).

Taking into account his professional career in the field of international trade, in March 2018 he was invited by the then presidential candidate Andrés Manuel López Obrador as his representative in the renegotiation of the North American Free Trade Agreement (NAFTA), when the negotiation was in charge of Enrique Peña Nieto´s government. When he became part of the transitional team of President-elect López Obrador, he made a significant contribution to unlock the negotiation and successfully conclude a new trade agreement, fair and beneficial to his country, which would strengthen collaboration through a framework of mutual respect between the countries involved.

A Mexican and Lebanese national, Ambassador Seade has lived for extended periods of time in Great Britain, Switzerland, USA, Hong Kong SAR, the People's Republic of China and its native Mexico, plus a year between France and Brazil, and he has worked closely with local officials and authorities in more than 70 countries in Africa, Latin America, Asia (including China), Europe, the Middle East and North America. A prominent part of his career has been in high-level positions in the three main international economic organizations: the World Bank (WB) where, being really young, he became responsible for economic work on Brazil; the International Monetary Fund (IMF) in which he handled the massive debt forgiveness of 15 African countries and led the work on the serious financial crises in Turkey, Brazil and Argentina; and the World Trade Organization (WTO), in whose creation he was a prominent negotiator and then a facilitator of consensus towards the completion of the difficult agreement that established it, and of which he was Deputy Director-General. He was nominated as a candidate for Director General of the WTO in 2020, but his nomination was not taken forward into the second round.

Academic career 
He graduated with honors as Chemical Engineer from the National Autonomous University of Mexico (UNAM) and earned his master and PhD in Economics from the University of Oxford, England, under the direction of James Mirrlees (Nobel Prize 1996). He was the second student to complete the master's program in a year that normally lasts two. His doctoral thesis is about optimal tax policies in face of the balance of effects on incentives and income distribution. During his last year as a student at Oxford University, he taught Masters Course of Microeconomics and published an article that continues to be an established reference in the area.

Professional Experience

World Bank 
From 1986 to 1989, he worked at the World Bank as Chief Economist. His duties were, first, as expert in charge of Fiscal Policy in the Country Policy Department, from where he had a sustained and important involvement on fiscal policy and reform on the Democratic Republic of the Congo (DRC), then Zaire, and on the design of Morocco's Value Added Tax (VAT). He later became Chief Economist leading all the economic work in the Department of Brazil, including the implementation of the new Brazilian VAT.

GATT and Uruguay Round 
In March 1989, Jesús Seade began as Mexico's ambassador to the GATT, where he led and won two major trade disputes, both with the U.S., over antidumping in cement and embargoes on tuna exports, he chaired several committees and working groups and was very active in the Uruguay Round negotiations.  This ambitious negotiation (1986–94) entered at the end of 1989, into a deep three-year state of crisis, after which the GATT directive was changed as a last attempt to revive and conclude the negotiations.

The new team, with Peter Sutherland at its head and Jesus Seade as one of its three Deputy Directors-General (DDG), managed to successfully conclude the negotiations (1993–94), including an important additional negotiation focused on the benefits and obligations of the Least Developed Countries (the 49 poorest countries in the world, as defined by the United Nations). This negotiation was led and chaired by DDG Seade and allowed the final closure of the negotiations as a whole and the creation of the WTO.

During this period of seeking to achieve the final outcome in the negotiations, Seade also conceived and led the preparation of the Review of the Uruguay Round Agreements, which was a formal requirement posed by the developing countries, to be fulfilled before closing the negotiations. This involved an in-depth and honest analysis of the results, rather than the expected short formal commentary, which played a central role in releasing tensions and helped significantly to reach a final agreement.

The Uruguay Round negotiations, the eighth round of the Multilateral Trade Negotiations of the GATT (General Agreement on Tariffs and Trade), were the most complex trade and/or economic negotiations that the multilateral trading system has ever successfully concluded. Throughout these negotiations, the creation of a new organization was never proposed: the aim was to reach a series of important agreements on different issues and sectors within the framework of the GATT itself. It was only towards the end of the negotiations that three members formulated the great proposal, to create a new institution: the WTO. The co-authors of this proposal were the European Economic Community (EEC, which in 1993 joined the European Union), Canada, and Mexico, the latter with Jesus Seade as its representative. 

During his tenure as Permanent Representative to the GATT, Ambassador Seade also led the Mexico's accession negotiations to the Organisation for Economic Cooperation and Development (OECD) in 1994, the first developing country to be part of it, as well as the works in the committees of which his country initially became part of: Trade and Competition.

World Trade Organization 
As Deputy Director-General of the new World Trade Organization, the most important multilateral organization created since World War II, considered to be ”the greatest effort to regulate world trade in human history", Ambassador Seade was directly responsible for a range of important sectors, including: the WTO's relations with government authorities in capitals, business sectors and press; the trade-finance relationship (coherence) and with the Bretton Woods institutions as well as with the United Nations System; development and training areas; and (alternatively) the areas of administration and personnel. On behalf of the WTO, he negotiated an ambitious Cooperation Agreement with the IMF with excellent terms for the WTO, as well as another with the World Bank.

International Monetary Fund (IMF) 
After the severe financial crisis that Asia suffered in 1997 and the serious aftermath of financial crises that, from then on, affected country by country the entire world in transition and development in the following years. In 1998 Ambassador Seade was invited to collaborate with the IMF, as Assistant Director, the person in charge of the work related to the strong financial crises that Argentina, Turkey and Brazil suffered (in relation to which he coordinated the largest loan in the history of the IMF at the time: a G7 syndication for $29 billion). Concurrently, he led the work for the massive external debt forgiveness of 15 highly indebted African countries within the framework of the HIPC Initiative (Highly Indebted Poor Countries).

After that, he was a Senior Tax Advisor, and headed a wide range of technical assistance and other specialized work in Africa, the Middle East, Latin America and Europe. He also supervised the IMF's work on banking, data and fiscal transparency and headed operations on fiscal transparency. Ambassador Seade was also the official responsible for the IMF's position on any aspect of trade policy that arose, including in relation to the WTO.

Other duties 
During 1976 to 1986, he was Chair Professor at the University of Warwick, G.B., where he founded and directed the Development Economics Research Centre; founding director of the Center for Economic Studies of El Colegio de México; and visiting professor for one semester each at the Center d'études prospectives en économie mathématique appliquée à la planning (CEPREMAP) in Paris, France, and at the Instituto de Matemática Pura e Aplicada (IMPA) in Rio de Janeiro, Brazil.

From 1998 to 2010, concurrently with his duties at the IMF and beyond, he was member of the Advisory Council on International Economic Law at Georgetown University Law School in Washington DC.

From 2008 to 2014 he was vice-president of Lingnan University in Hong Kong and from 2007 to 2016 he was Chair professor in economics. During that period he was member of the advisory councils of the Ministers of Financial Services, and Commerce and Industry of Hong Kong SAR government; and led an ambitious study carried out by several Hong Kong universities with official sponsorship on Hong Kong as a financial center for China and the world. Since 2007 he has played an important role in the development of the Hong Kong Social Enterprise Research Academy on promoting Corporate Social Responsibility of which he is Vice President.

In 2017, he accepted and started functions as Associate Vice President for Global Affairs at the Chinese University of Hong Kong-Shenzhen, located in Shenzhen, Guangdong Province, PRC.

During those 12 years, 2007-2018, he had extensive participation in official, financial and business forums of Hong Kong SAR and the People's Republic of China.

Negotiation of USMCA 
After the electoral victory of President Andrés Manuel López Obrador on July 1, 2018 in Mexico, Dr. Jesús Seade took possession of his appointment as negotiator in the modernization of NAFTA, initially accompanying the negotiating team of Peña Nieto’s government. The negotiation of the USMCA formally concluded on September 30, 2018 and the agreement was signed in Argentina on November 30, 2018, by the Heads of State: Enrique Peña Nieto, then President of Mexico; Donald Trump of the United States and Justin Trudeau, Prime Minister of Canada. However, the ratification process in the United States came to an impasse as control in the US Congress changed with the legislative elections of November 2018. It became necessary to reopen the negotiating process in a limited way, to find a solution to the main problems posed by the Democratic majority in the US Congress, in a way that was acceptable and satisfactory for the three countries.

President López Obrador again appointed Jesús Seade as chief negotiator, already with the position of Undersecretary for North America at the Ministry of Foreign Affairs, whose main task would be to ensure that any adjustment in what was negotiated was good for Mexico to promote the ratification of the T-MEC. He also entrusted him with the responsibility for all other trade negotiations with the United States, particularly in relation to tariffs on Mexican steel and aluminum exports imposed by the United States under section 232 of its commercial expansion law of 1962 (national security), which was a clear obstacle for the UMSCA ratification in both countries.

Having received in April 2019 the task of solving this one-year-old problem, which had already greatly damaged the Mexican steel and aluminum industry, in an intense three-week negotiation, a fully satisfactory resolution for both sides was reached. Likewise, after difficult negotiations during the rest of the year focused on the demand of many members of Congress to have strong and reliable provisions to ensure Mexico's compliance with its commitments in all areas of the treaty, a minimum modified agreement was reached from what was previously accorded. Its central result is a clear improvement for the three member countries: the creation of a balanced, binding, law-based State-State dispute settlement system, a system that NAFTA never counted on due to problems technicians who have clashed since then.

On June 19, 2019, the Mexican Senate approved the USMCA as it was initially negotiated with 114 votes in favor, 4 against and 3 abstentions, and on December 12 of the same year it approved the aforementioned Modifying Protocol, by a majority of 107 votes in favor, 1 against and 0 abstentions. The United States House of Representatives approved the implementing bill of the USMCA on December 19, 2019 with 385 votes in favor and 41 against, and the US Senate approved it on January 16, 2020 with 89 votes in favor and 10 against. Finally, the House of Commons and the Canadian Senate approved the treaty implementation law on March 13, 2020, in both instances unanimously.

The USMCA, in Mexico, was negotiated by two governments of very different partisanship and approved by a vast majority; in the USA, significantly supported by both parties and approved by huge majorities in both chambers of the legislature; and in Canada, unanimously approved by both chambers. Thus, the broad level of support and virtual political consensus that the new treaty enjoys in all three countries is clear and promising.

Unfounded embezzlement research
In his time as Undersecretary for North America in the Mexican government, Seade Kuri was denounced for embezzlement and abusing functions on the Alert Citizens portal of the Civil Service Secretariat, a fact that was released by the newspaper El Universal on October 14, 2020.17 According to the anonymous citizen complaint, the official used public funds for the making of five private trips to Hong Kong for an amount greater than 800 thousand pesos, pretending to make official commissions in that Asian city on behalf of the government of Mexico.  
The charges were investigated ex officio by the Secretariat of the Federal Public Service. On October 14, 2020 at night, the official exercised his right of reply and sent a letter to the national newspaper stating that the accusations are false.20 According to Seade, those 5 publicly resourced trips to Hong Kong, some lasting between 10 and 20 days each and in first class, aimed to "strengthen communication channels with local authorities and businessmen with respect to the T-MEC." In his letter he also stated that he paid for his bag air tickets from 2 of the 5 first-class trips to Hong Kong.
On 6 November 2020, the Internal Control Body of the Secretariat of Foreign Affairs concluded an administrative investigation against Jesus Seade, ruled that "not enough evidence was found to likely demonstrate the commission of any conduct for which administrative responsibility is no longer noticed".

Miguel Hidalgo Prize 

On November 11, 2020, president Andrés Manuel López Obrador awarded Seade the Presea Miguel Hidalgo (an important award to citizens' contribution to their country, which on November 20, 2020, was also awarded to 425 health care workers) At the brief ceremony, that took place during López Obrador's daily morning press conference, Seade announced he was retiring from public office and quitting Mexico, in order to move back to Hong Kong.

References 

21st-century Mexican economists
1946 births
Politicians from Mexico City
National Autonomous University of Mexico alumni
El Colegio de México alumni
Alumni of the University of Oxford
World Trade Organization people
Academics of the University of Warwick
Academic staff of Lingnan University
Chinese University of Hong Kong people
20th-century Mexican economists
Mexican expatriates in the United Kingdom
Mexican expatriates in China
World Bank people
Living people